Chirripó National Park is a national park of Costa Rica, encompassing parts of three provinces: San José, Limón and Cartago. It was established in 1975.

Geography

Chirripó is the 38th most prominent peak in the world. In terms of Holdridge life zones, the park can be categorized into five ecosystems: lowland tropical wet forest, premontane tropical wet forest, lower montane wet forest, montane wet forest and subalpine wet forest (páramo). Most of the park consists of both primary rain forests and primary cloud forests. Around  it changes to wet desert.

Summiting the peak begins with a hike along a  uphill trail from the town of San Gerardo de Rivas to the park ranger's refuge in the Los Crestones sector; that is followed by a  walk to the peak.

Climate
The climate is dominated by two seasons: a dry season lasting from December to April and a wet season from May to November,

During the dry season the upper regions are susceptible to fires. The latest recorded events have occurred in 1953, 1958, 1976, 1977, 1981 and 1992.

The park is one of the coldest places in Costa Rica. In fact, the coldest temperature ever recorded in Costa Rica was recorded here.

Las Nubes

The Las Nubes Centre for Neotropical Conservation and Research is a facility located at the southwest corner of the park and managed by York University of Toronto through an agreement with Costa Rica's Tropical Science Center.

Ramsar site  
Part of the  Ramsar site is located within this protected area and shared with Tapantí National Park, Los Quetzales National Park, Macho River Forest Reserve, Vueltas Hill Biological Reserve and Los Santos Forest Reserve.

References

External links
 Chirripó National Park at Costa Rica National Parks

National parks of Costa Rica
Protected areas established in 1975
Geography of Cartago Province
Geography of Limón Province
Geography of San José Province
Tourist attractions in Cartago Province
Tourist attractions in Limón Province
Tourist attractions in San José Province
Talamancan montane forests
Isthmian–Pacific moist forests